Patrick Miles may refer to:

Patrick Miles Jr. (born 1967), former U.S. Attorney for the Western District of Michigan 
Patrick Miles (writer) (born 1948),  English writer and translator

See also
Patrick Myles (fl. 2000s–2010s), Irish actor, filmmaker and producer